Leba may refer to:
Łeba (German: Leba), a town in Pomerania, Poland
Łeba River (German: Leba), a river in Pomerania, Poland, flowing into the Baltic Sea 
Lêba, a village in Tibet
, a German cargo ship in service 1940-45